Alexey Vermeulen (born December 16, 1994, in Memphis, Tennessee) is an American cyclist currently competing on the professional mountain bike circuit. He now competes for Jukebox Cycling, a multi-discipline team of six riders.

Vermeulen has become famous on the circuit for training with Sir Willie the Weiner, a long-haired miniature dachshund that he carries in a backpack. Willie belongs to Vermeulen's girlfriend, Sophie Linn.

In 2022 he won the Belgian Waffle Ride California on this third attempt, beating second place Matthew Beers by over 6 minutes.

Major results

2011
 1st  Road race, National Junior Road Championships
 5th Overall Tour de l'Abitibi
 10th Overall Regio-Tour Junior
2012
 2nd Overall Tour de l'Abitibi
 4th Overall 3-Etappen-Rundfahrt
 5th Overall Regio-Tour Junior
 9th Omloop der Vlaamse Gewesten
2014
 6th Overall Course de la Paix U23
2015
 National Under-23 Road Championships
2nd Time trial
4th Road race
 7th Overall Ronde de l'Isard
2016
 3rd Time trial, National Road Championships
2017
 3rd Road race, National Road Championships
2018
 1st Peak2Peak Mountain Bike Race
 2nd Overall Tour du Maroc
1st Stage 4
 2nd Bell's Iceman Cometh Challenge
 6th Overall Tour de Beauce
 10th Overall Tour of Qinghai Lake
2019
 1st Bell's Iceman Cometh Challenge
2021
 4th Road race, National Road Championships
2022
 1st Belgian Waffle Ride California
 1st Bell's Iceman Cometh Challenge

References

External links

1994 births
Living people
American male cyclists
Sportspeople from Memphis, Tennessee